Antioch is an unincorporated community in Troup County, in the U.S. state of Georgia.

History
A post office called Antioch was established in 1846, and remained in operation until 1916. In 1900, the community had 58 inhabitants.

References

Unincorporated communities in Troup County, Georgia
Unincorporated communities in Georgia (U.S. state)